Hedding may refer to:

Hedding, New Jersey, an unincorporated area within Mansfield Township
Hedding College, a former college in Abingdon, Illinois

People with the surname
Elijah Hedding (1780–1852), American bishop
Malcolm Hedding (born 1952), South African activist